Garet Hunt (born October 14, 1987) is a Canadian professional ice hockey winger currently playing in the KHL for Kunlun Red Star.

Hunt was most recently with ASC Corona Brasov in the Erste Liga, and was previously a stalwart with former ECHL club, the Stockton Thunder. He is best known for his agitating playing style.

Playing career
Hunt began his junior career with the Chilliwack Chiefs of the British Columbia Hockey League (BCHL).  In 2004–05, he joined the Vancouver Giants of the major junior Western Hockey League (WHL).  He would go on to play four seasons with the Giants and establish himself as an effective agitator, while helping the club to the 2006 President's Cup championship as WHL champions and the 2007 Memorial Cup championship as Canadian major junior champions (although Hunt missed the entirety of the 2007 playoffs due to a broken leg).  In his final year of junior in 2007–08, he recorded WHL career-highs with 18 points and 239 penalty minutes in addition to a league-high 27 fighting majors.

Undrafted at the end of his junior career, Hunt signed a minor league contract with the Edmonton Oilers of the National Hockey League (NHL) affiliate, the Springfield Falcons of the American Hockey League (AHL). Hunt was then assigned to the Stockton Thunder of the ECHL for his professional rookie season in 2008–09. During his rookie season with the Thunder, Hunt played 69 games and contributed 16 points (5 goals and 11 assists).  He also finished second in the ECHL with 248 penalty minutes.

After remaining in Stockton upon the Thunder relocating to Adirondack, Hunt earned a try-out contract to attend the newly installed AHL franchise, the Stockton Heat training camp. Upon his release from the Heat, Hunt signed for just his second ECHL club, in the Alaska Aces on November 4, 2015. Hunt's number was later retired by the Stockton Thunder and upon leaving the ECHL after 11 seasons, he was the most penalized player in history with 2666 PIM in 702 games.

On July 4, 2019, Hunt was signed by Chinese club, HC Kunlun Red Star of the KHL, to a two-year contract. Reconnecting with his Chinese origin, Hunt would be eligible to play for China at the 2022 Beijing Olympics.

Hunt signed with the Wheeling Nailers of the ECHL on March 8, 2021. In 7 appearances with the Nailers, Hunt added 3 points and 21 penalty minutes.

As a free agent, Hunt extended his career in Europe, agreeing to a contract with Romanian club ASC Corona Brasov of the Erste Liga on August 11, 2021.

On November 28, 2021 against Csíkszereda, he received multiple penalties stemming from a fight, namely 5 minutes for fighting and a 20 minute game misconduct. He received an additional 20 minutes for abuse of officials for throwing a trash can onto the ice towards the linesmen. This resulted in a nine game suspension.

After a season in Romania, in July 2022 Hunt initially signed for the Nottingham Panthers of the Elite Ice Hockey League for the 2022–23 season. However, in August 2022 it was announced he would not be joining Nottingham after instead being offered a contract in the KHL. Hunt instead returned to the KHL with HC Kunlun Red Star.

Career statistics

References

External links

1987 births
Living people
Alaska Aces (ECHL) players
Canadian ice hockey left wingers
Chilliwack Chiefs players
Ice hockey people from British Columbia
Jacksonville Icemen players
HC Kunlun Red Star players
People from Maple Ridge, British Columbia
Springfield Falcons players
Stockton Thunder players
Vancouver Giants players
Wheeling Nailers players
Worcester Sharks players